Francesco Luoni (born 9 April 1988 in Varese) is an Italian professional football player who currently plays for U.S.D. 1913 Seregno Calcio in Serie D.

Career

Seregno
Luoni joined Seregno ahead of the 2019/20 season.

References

External links

1988 births
Living people
Italian footballers
Serie B players
Serie D players
S.S.D. Varese Calcio players
U.C. AlbinoLeffe players
Como 1907 players
Calcio Lecco 1912 players
U.S. 1913 Seregno Calcio players
Sportspeople from Varese
Association football defenders
Footballers from Lombardy
A.S.D. Fanfulla players